The Presidency of Iván Duque began on 7 August 2018, being inaugurated as the 33rd president of Colombia to Juan Manuel Santos and ended on 7 August 2022 handing over to the government of Gustavo Petro.

Domestic policy

Legislature 
The beginning of the legislative agenda of the government of Iván Duque was characterized by various crises and clashes with the legislative and judicial branches. One of the first actions of his government was to object to the Law that created the Special Jurisdiction for Peace as he had agreed in the Peace Agreements with the FARC-EP. Duque's objections were rejected when he received 110 negative votes in the House of Representatives and 40 votes against in the Senate, a decision that was ratified by the Constitutional Court. 7 Another of the great reforms that he tried to promote in the first place was the reform tax that sought to collect the vision of the "orange economy" proposed in the campaign. Said tax reform law was called the "financing law.".

The financing law promoted by the national government was declared unenforceable by the Constitutional Court, which led to the processing and approval of a new reform. In order not to affect the country's finances, the Court pronounced the effects of the Law until 1 January 2020. Likewise, the Constitutional Court is studying a claim of unconstitutionality against the current National Development Plan.

At the end of 2019, the Government of Duque managed to pass several laws, such as the new tax reform approved in the early hours of 20 December, or the 2013 Law that requires government officials to publish their declaration of assets and income, to register possible conflicts of interest and the declaration of income tax and complementary.

Environment 
In environmental matters, the Government issued a series of measures that would allow studying the possibility of applying hydraulic fracturing in the country; To this end, a commission of experts on the subject was formed, which determined the need to carry out pilot tests, in order to analyze the impact of this technique in context. All this, despite the fact that in a campaign event held in Bucaramanga, on 11 April 2018, Iván Duque had stated that: "here we have an overlapping of complex and diverse ecosystems, underground aquifers of enormous wealth and risks of greater seismicity due to the type of soil, which is why I have said that fracking will not be carried out in Colombia".

Notwithstanding the foregoing, the Council of State suspended the rules that regulate fracking Even so, the pilot tests to implement this technique in the country remained firm. Until April 2021, two of these pilots had been approved, which were assigned to the companies Ecopetrol and ExxonMobil.

In agricultural matters, a resolution of the Ministry of Agriculture at the end of 2019 that decreed the fishing quotas for the following year caused great controversy, since it was believed that it would allow finning, consisting of cutting the fins of sharks to market them. The Government clarified that these quotas have been established since at least 2010, and that finning is prohibited in the country; however, various analysts question the capacity of the State to enforce regulations on said practice.

Infrastructure 
After more than 100 years of planning, and 11 of construction, Duque inaugurated the Tunel de la Línea, the longest tunnel in Latin America, and the most anticipated and important work in the country.15161718 The work suffered many delays throughout a century of works, and after several corruption scandals surrounding its construction.

Human rights 
In terms of human rights, on 6 November 2019, a motion of censure was carried out in the Congress of the Republic against Defense Minister Guillermo Botero, the fifth motion of censure presented against a government minister in less than one year.

In this same context, the government was accused of having hidden the death of seven minors in Caquetá during a bombardment, who were later reported as guerrillas killed in combat. These accusations were again the subject of debate in Congress after a New York Times investigation reported on new guidelines from high command of the Armed Forces. that could allow the reappearance of the execution of civilians by the military.

The magazine Semana would report on a silence operation within the army orchestrated by the high command to identify and punish the military who had denounced human rights abuses. In an event in which the President was present in the city of Barranquilla, a journalist asked the president about the death of minors in a bombing in Caquetá, to which the president replied, without it being clear if he had managed to hear the journalist: "What are you talking about, old man?", opening controversy again in social networks. The journalist in question then reported having been beaten by the president's bodyguards.

Institutional crisis

2019 protests 

As a result of all these scandals, Defense Minister Guillermo Botero resigned before his imminent expulsion from the cabinet that was coming with the vote of the motion of censure, generating an institutional crisis. It was in this atmosphere of political tension that the Government of Duque received a new blow, when on 5 October the Central Unitaria de Trabajadores de Colombia announced a national strike for 21 November.

The reason for the strike was expressed through a statement, in which, according to the union leaders, the Government looking for:

Additionally, the organizers of the strike called for the march to protest the creation of an international financial holding company, which according to the organizers of the strike would be issued "in order to privatize the public financial sector."

The government reacted to the announcement of the strike by increasing security measures, through the deployment of the National Army and National Police in the main cities, but expressing its support for the free exercise of constitutional right and for peaceful protest, without disturbances. Likewise, the Government denied that it was interested in making pension or labor reforms that went against the middle and popular classes of the country, and declared that the announcements about such intentions were false news.

On 21 November, the National Strike was held, which had a massive call throughout the country, [citation needed] seeing the commerce and traffic of some sectors in certain cities paralyzed. Cities like Bogotá or Medellín had military contingents arranged at strategic points to protect the transportation and service infrastructure. The day passed normally in the country, except in Bogotá and Cali, where there were serious disturbances. In Cali, the mayor decreed a curfew, and the city was taken over by the Army's Third Brigade, due to the report of alleged bands of looters, and the sound of shots and explosions.

Later, on 22 November, a curfew was decreed in Bogotá. Critics of the government accused these measures of putting the country under a state of siege. The curfew imposed in Bogotá was the first curfew decreed by a government since 1977. As a result of the national strike, the approval of the Duque government fell to 26%.

2020 protests 
After the Christmas and New Year holidays, meetings were held between the national government and the union, student and social organizations promoting the National Strike, without results, in a failed attempt at dialogue, riots began on the outskirts of the National University of Colombia on Avenida NQS in Bogotá, and the mayoress Claudia López sends the ESMAD to suppress the demonstrations. The National Strike Committee calls for a new cacerolazo and day of national strike. In the morning hours, in the main cities There were several blockades in the streets and thousands of people again expressed their discontent against the government of Iván Duque, there were some clashes with the ESMAD and the public force, in turn, abuses by the authorities were denounced on social networks. In Bogotá, Mayor Claudia López highlights the new protocol for the protests, declaring that “there were no deaths to lament.”

Later in February of that same year, marches of university teachers and students were held, most of them proceeded normally, except for a disturbance that occurred in the vicinity of the Francisco José de Caldas District University.

On September 9 and 10, in various sectors of Bogotá, there was an uprising against police violence following the murder of Javier Ordóñez. Demonstrations against police violence and for economic solutions during the pandemic took place the following days and the deaths of another 12 people were recorded.

On October 10, an indigenous minga traveled the route between Cauca and Bogotá, where it arrived on October 18. At the call of the union centrals, a National Strike was held on October 21 and a large demonstration was held in the capital of the Republic, with the participation of the Minga. The following day the Misak indigenous people occupied the Eldorado International Airport for 7 hours .

2021 protests 

The breaches by the Duque government of the agreements reached during the 2019-2020 protests in Colombia, added to the COVID-19 pandemic and the state's mismanagement of the pandemic, the 2021 Tax Reform, the Reform to Health of 2020, impunity in crimes against social leaders, and the lack of job and academic opportunities for the general population, as well as unfortunate and out of context comments by the Minister of Finance, Alberto Carrasquilla, led to new mobilizations at the end of the April 2021.

However, the government responded with repression to the demonstrations and curfews have been decreed in different sectors of the country. In addition, and given the escalation of violence, the government finally withdrew the Tax Reform project on 2 May 2021, and on Monday, 3 May, the Minister of Finance and his deputy minister announced their resignation.

The mismanagement of the protests has resulted in human rights violations, contempt of the authorities, abuse of the authorities, looting, burning and vandalizing buildings, shopping malls, military units; vandalization of monuments, the use of weapons prohibited by IHL, direct confrontations between protesters and public forces that leave an enormous balance of injuries and few deaths, among many other problems.

There have also been roadblocks, food shortages, and attacks on the Colombian press.

To date, large mobilizations continue to be registered throughout Colombia.

Foreign policy

Venezuela
From his campaign, Duque affirmed in a meeting with the Vice President of the United States, Mike Pence, that in Venezuela "democracy must be restored"  In the same way, on 5 July 2018, he traveled to the border with Venezuela, to meet with María Corina Machado, a Venezuelan opposition leader, in order to "strengthen ties" with the Venezuelan opposition. In August of that year, he described the government of Nicolás Maduro as a dictatorship, and affirms the need to holding free elections in that country, he also indicated that "if the" dictatorship "does not end, migration does not stop".

References

Duque, Iván
Presidency of Iván Duque
Iván Duque
2018 establishments in Colombia
2010s in Colombia
Duque